This is a list of countries by chromium ore mining in 2019, based on the United States Geological Survey.

Chromium is a chemical element that is designated by the symbol Cr and has an atomic number of 24. It is usually found as the mineral chromite, from which ferrochrome is produced in a smelting process.

References

Lists of countries by mineral production
Production by country